HFP may refer to:
 California Healthy Families Program
 Heptafluoropropane
 Heritage Film Project
 Hexadecimal floating point
 Hexafluoropropylene
 Humanitarian Futures Programme
 Bavarian School of Public Policy
 Hands-free profile, a Bluetooth profile